Perigonia glaucescens is a moth of the  family Sphingidae. It is known from the Dominican Republic and Haiti.

It can be distinguished from all other Perigonia species by the olive-green head and thorax, characteristic forewing upperside pattern and the broad white or cream band across the upperside of abdominal segment six.

References

glaucescens
Moths of the Caribbean
Insects of Haiti
Insects of the Dominican Republic
Endemic fauna of Hispaniola
Moths described in 1856